Harry Phillips (born 1890, date of death unknown) was a South African long-distance runner. He competed in the marathon at the 1924 Summer Olympics.

References

External links
 

1890 births
Year of death missing
South African male long-distance runners
South African male marathon runners
Olympic athletes of South Africa
Athletes (track and field) at the 1924 Summer Olympics